Ann Nolan Clark, born Anna Marie Nolan (December 5, 1896 – December 13, 1995), was an American writer who won the 1953 Newbery Medal.

Biography
Born in Las Vegas, New Mexico in 1896, Clark graduated from New Mexico Normal School (now New Mexico Highlands University) in Las Vegas at age 21, and married Thomas Patrick Clark on August 6, 1919. She gave birth to an only son, Thomas Patrick, Jr., who later died as a pilot in World War II.

She began her career teaching English at what is now the Highlands University. However, in the early 1920s, she transferred to a job teaching children how to read for the Tesuque pueblo people, which lasted for 25 years. Clark found that the underfunded Tesuque School couldn't afford any substantial instructional material. In the process of teaching the children about literature, she incorporated their voices and stories to write In My Mother's House, and other books for the 1st to 4th grade one-room schoolhouse. She wrote about this process, and about her travels to many parts of Central and South America, in her nonfiction book, Journey to the People.

Between 1940 and 1951, the United States Bureau of Indian Affairs published 15 of her books, all relating to her experiences with the Tesuque pueblo people. Her book In My Mother's House, illustrated by Pueblo artist Velino Herrera, was named a Caldecott Honor book in 1942.

In 1945, the Institute for Inter-American Affairs sent Clark to live and travel for five years in Mexico, Guatemala, Costa Rica, Ecuador, Peru, and Brazil.
Those experiences led her to write books such as Magic Money, Looking-for-Something, and Secret of the Andes, which won the 1953 Newbery Medal. In the 1940s she also wrote books for the Haskell Foundation and the Haskell Indian Nations University at Lawrence, KS; one of them " The Slim Butte Raccoon" was illustrated by Andrew Standing Soldier.

She also won the Catholic Library Association's 1963 Regina Medal, and the Bureau of Indian Affairs' 1962 Distinguished Service Award. Clark died in 1995 in Arizona, after writing 31 books which took a glance at Native American culture, mostly through the eyes of its children.

Mr. Clark's birth family was well known in the early 20th century in her hometown of Las Vegas, New Mexico, and their home, the Nolan House, is on the National Register of Historic Places as one of the first quarry stone houses there.

Writings
Secret of the Andes
Tia Maria's Garden
 The little Indian pottery maker
The Little Indian Basket Maker
Bear cub
Little Herder in Spring
Little Herder in Summer
Little Herder in Autumn
Little Herder in Winter
Magic Money
Year Walk
Circle of Seasons

See also
 American literature

References

External links
Ann Nolan Clark Manuscripts AC 043, Fray Angélico Chávez History Library, Santa Fe, New Mexico.
Ann Nolan Clark Drafts MSS 23 via Utah State University.
Ann Nolan Clark papers, 1962-1979 MS 309, Special Collections, University of Arizona Libraries, Tucson, Arizona.

Personal reflection of Ann Nolan Clark's secretary Theda Rushing MSS-799-SC, Center for Southwest Research, University of New Mexico Libraries, Albuquerque, New Mexico.

1896 births
1995 deaths
Place of death missing
20th-century American historians
Schoolteachers from New Mexico
American travel writers
American women travel writers
Newbery Medal winners
People from Las Vegas, New Mexico
New Mexico Highlands University alumni
Native American studies
American women historians
20th-century American women writers
20th-century American short story writers
20th-century American educators
20th-century American women educators